Hadseløya or Hadseløy is an island in Hadsel Municipality in Nordland county, Norway. It is located in the Vesterålen region on the north side of the Hadselfjorden.  The town of Stokmarknes is situated on the northern shore of the island and the village of Melbu is on the southern coast.

Hadseløya is connected to the neighboring islands of Langøya and Børøya by the Hadsel Bridge. There is also a ferry connection from the village of Melbu to the village of Fiskebøl on Austvågøya island to the south.

See also
List of islands of Norway

References

External links
Satellite image of island at Satellite View

Hadsel
Islands of Nordland
Vesterålen